The Shetland goose is a breed of domestic geese originating in the Shetland Islands in Scotland. Like the other livestock breeds native to the islands, the Shetland goose is small in stature, generally weighing between 12 and 14 pounds (5 and 6 kilos). They are very hardy and exceptionally good foragers, and are able to largely sustain themselves through grazing.

History 
The Shetland goose has been used by crofters to graze pastures. This was to rid the grass of parasites, such as the liver fluke, to prepare it for grazing by sheep.

Characteristics 
Like a few other goose breeds, including the Pilgrim and Cotton Patch, Shetlands are sexually dimorphic at hatch (called auto-sexing in poultry nomenclature), and can be differentiated on appearance alone. Ganders have entirely white plumage, while geese have a head, neck, and upper body with gray highlights and a white underbody. They generally mate for life, and are good parents. Shetland geese lay around 30 eggs a year, that are white in colour. The Shetland goose has a shorter bill, due to its natural ability to forage.

Shetlands were first exported to United States in 1997, by a farm in New York. They are not yet recognized by the American Poultry Association via admittance in the Standard of Perfection. The breed is currently being studied by the American Livestock Breeds Conservancy, which considers populations in North America to potentially be too low to maintain sufficient genetic diversity (in North America).

References

See also
 List of goose breeds
 Shetland animal breeds

Goose breeds
Goose breeds originating in Scotland
Goose breeds originating in the United Kingdom
Shetland animal breeds
Animal breeds on the RBST Watchlist